HMS Bahamas (K503) was a  of the United Kingdom that served during World War II. She originally was ordered by the United States Navy as the  USS Hotham (PF-75) and was transferred to the Royal Navy prior to completion.

Construction and acquisition
The ship, originally designated a "patrol gunboat," PG-183, was ordered by the United States Maritime Commission under a United States Navy contract as the first USS Hotham. Laid down by the Walsh-Kaiser Company at Providence, Rhode Island, on 7 April 1943, she was reclassified as a "patrol frigate," PF-75, on 15 April 1943. Intended for transfer to the United Kingdom, the ship was renamed Bahamas by the British prior to launching and was launched on 17 August 1943, sponsored by Mrs. James A. Gallagher.

Service history
Transferred to the United Kingdom under Lend-Lease on 6 December 1943, the ship served in the Royal Navy as HMS Bahamas (K503) on patrol and escort duty. A Soviet tug later took over the tow from Bahamas and successfully delivered Cassandra to the Kola Inlet.

Disposal
The United Kingdom returned Bahamas to the U.S. Navy on 11 June 1946. She was transferred to the U.S. Maritime Commission for disposal and subsequently sold to the John J. Duane Company of Quincy, Massachusetts, for scrapping on 16 December 1947.

References

Notes

Bibliography
 
 Navsource Online: Frigate Photo Archive HMS Bahama (K 503) ex-Hotham ex-PF-75 ex-PG-183

1943 ships
Ships built in Providence, Rhode Island
Tacoma-class frigates
Colony-class frigates
World War II frigates and destroyer escorts of the United States
World War II frigates of the United Kingdom
Royal Navy ship names